Hendrik Toompere Jr. Jr. (born 17 November 1986) is an Estonian actor.

Toompere was born Tallinn to actor and director Hendrik Toompere Jr. His grandparents were actors Hendrik Toompere Sr. and Maie Toompere (née Kruusenberg). His aunt is actress Harriet Toompere. His great-grandfather was wrestler Herman Kruusenberg.

In 2010 he graduated from at Estonian Academy of Music and Theatre's Drama School. Since 2010 he has been working at the Estonian Drama Theatre, and since 2018 has been the theater's stage manager. Besides theatrical roles he has also played in several films.

Selected filmography

 2012 Seenelkäik (role: Villu Koobalt)
 2013 Elavad pildid (roles: Erik, Paul, Mihhail/Mihkel)
 2015 1944 (role: Kristjan Põder)
 2016 Päevad, mis ajasid segadusse (role: Allar)
 2017 Keti lõpp (role: Young man)
 2021 Sandra saab tööd (role: Kaarel)
 2022 Erik Kivisüda (role: Maria's father)

References

Living people
1986 births
Estonian male film actors
Estonian male stage actors
Estonian male television actors
21st-century Estonian actors
Estonian Academy of Music and Theatre alumni
Male actors from Tallinn